Wayne Ormond (born 15 July 1973) is an Australian entrepreneur and businessman. He is the founder and former executive chairman of Refund Home Loans.

Ormond launched Refund Home Loans in 2004; by 2010, Refund had grown to five companies providing integrated mortgage brokerage, real estate and financial services to consumers through over 350 franchises around Australia.

Early life
Ormond grew up on his family's cattle property in Far North Queensland. After finishing high school, Ormond worked with local businesses.

At age 21, Ormond moved to Brisbane to begin a career in property sales. For the next seven years he worked with two major property companies, becoming the group managing director for four Raine & Horne real estate franchises.  Ormond then worked at Suncorp Metway in Brisbane.

Refund Home Loans
Ormond established Refund Home Loans in 2004. Refund Home Loans was an Australian mortgage broking service. It conducted its business through the company's mobile Franchisees and provided its customers with a share of the mortgage broker's commission. Ormond expanded into other services, including Refund Financial Planning, Refund Real Estate, Refund Property Investment and Refund Finance & Leasing.

Ormond's companies were featured in BRW business magazine in 11 of their flagship industry editions including BRW Fast Franchise, BRW Fast Starters and the BRW Young Rich List which features the top 100 wealthiest under 40s; in 2009 Ormond was listed at number 74. In 2009, Ormond was listed as Queensland's richest bachelor. Ormond appeared on SBS's Insight program when the topic of discussion was intelligence.

In October 2009, the Australian Competition & Consumer Commission commenced proceedings against Refund Home Loans and Ormond over accusations they breached the Trade Practices Act 1974.

Foreclosure Fighting Fund
The idea for Ormond's charity, The Foreclosure Fighting Fund, came from his involvement with Channel 7's Today Tonight series, which showed families threatened with home []foreclosure by banks and other mortgage lenders. Ormond's idea was that these foreclosures could often be averted if the homeowners receive experienced advice.

Administration
Refund Home Loans was put into administration in late 2011. SV Partners Brisbane were appointed administrators. Refund Home Loans was purchased by Homeloans Ltd in June 2012.

References

External links
 

1973 births
Living people